Antoni Mroczkowski  was a Polish ace pilot in the Imperial Russian Air Force during the World War I with 5 confirmed kills.

Biography
In August 1914 Antoni Mroczkowski served in the Imperial Russian Army. In 1915 he completed pilot training in Sevastopol. From 1915 to 1917 he flew in the 24th Air corps. He scored his first victory on an Albatros near Tuchyn in Volhynia. He was wounded two times, and was also shot down in error by Russian artillery. In 1917 he was promoted captain.

In Odessa Mroczkowski joined a Polish Air Force unit and from 1919 he served in an escadrille attached to the 10th Infantry Division. He worked as instructor in a flying school in Warsaw, then he was a test pilot in Centralne Warsztaty Lotnicze. In 1920 he was assigned to the 19th Fighter Escadrille. In 1921 Morczkowski was given an indefinite leave of absence. Later he returned to his profession as test pilot in Plage i Laśkiewicz in Lublin. He was fired for participation in a strike.

In 1939 Mroczkowski arrived in France then he reached Great Britain. In the UK he flew multi-engine airplanes. Due to his age he was transferred to the ground service.

Mroczkowski came back in Poland in 1946. During his career he flew over 8000 hours on 85 different aircraft.

Antoni Mroczkowski died in Warsaw on 26 December 1970.

Awards
 Virtuti Militari, Silver Cross
 Order of Polonia Restituta, Knight's Cross
 Cross of Independence
  Medal of the 10th Anniversary of People's Poland

References

Further reading
 Jerzy Jędrzejewski. Polscy piloci doświadczalni. Biblioteka Historyczna Instytutu Lotnictwa 2014 r.

External links
 Biografia Antoniego Mroczkowskiego
 Wzmianka o asach myśliwskich okresu I wojny światowej wraz z Antonim Mroczkowskim

1970 deaths
1896 births
Military personnel from Odesa
People from Odessky Uyezd
People from the Russian Empire of Polish descent
Russian aviators
Polish aviators
Russian military personnel of World War I
Imperial Russian Air Force personnel
Russian World War I flying aces
Recipients of the Silver Cross of the Virtuti Militari
Recipients of the Order of Polonia Restituta
Recipients of the Cross of Independence
Polish test pilots